Avenue of Mysteries is a 2015 novel by American author John Irving, his 14th novel.  The book was published in November 2015 by Simon & Schuster.

Synopsis
The narrative traces the life of Juan Diego, an aging writer, who travels to the Philippines while struggling with his memories of growing up as a boy in Mexico. As Ron Charles in The Washington Post noted,

Reception
Initial reviews just before and after publication of Avenue of Mysteries were, in general, laudatory. In the New York Times Book Review, novelist Tayari Jones was particularly effusive in her admiration, even though she was careful to distinguish Avenue of Mysteries from Irving's masterpieces, among these The Cider House Rules and A Prayer for Owen Meany. If below the standard of these latter novels, nevertheless Jones thought that Avenue of Mysteries held its own: 

Kirkus Reviews offered the novel muted praise: "although not as irresistible as early works such as The World According to Garp and The Hotel New Hampshire, a welcome return to form." Washington Post Book World editor Ron Charles found vintage Irving here, the author casting familiar elements and themes within "new permutations" amidst "a particularly touching and sometimes farcical story of two siblings and their makeshift family." This same reviewer also noted that although Irving does not shirk from depicting a "dangerous, violent world", the story was cast in a semi-comical glow that was reminiscent of John Steinbeck's Cannery Row.

References

External links
 Author's web site.
 Canadian publisher's web site.
 US publisher's web site.
 UK publisher's web site.
 John Irving in conversation with Jeanette Winterson about Avenue of Mysteries

2015 American novels
Novels about writers
Novels by John Irving
Novels set in Manila
Novels set in Mexico
Simon & Schuster books